The 2006–07 Tennessee Lady Volunteers basketball team represented the University of Tennessee. The head coach was Pat Summitt. The team played its home games in the Thompson-Boling Arena and was a member of the Southeastern Conference. The Lady Vols won their seventh national championship

SEC Women’s Basketball tournament
Tennessee (1) 81, South Carolina (8) 63
LSU (4) 63, Tennessee 54

NCAA basketball tournament
Seeding in brackets
Dayton Regional
 Tennessee (1) 76, Drake (16) 37
 Tennessee 68, Pittsburgh (8) 54
Tennessee 65, Marist (13) 46
Tennessee 98, Mississippi (7) 62
Final Four
Tennessee 56, North Carolina 50
 Tennessee 59, Rutgers 46

Awards and honors
Alexis Hornbuckle, SEC All-Tournament Team
Candace Parker, Tournament Most Outstanding Player
Candace Parker, USBWA Player of the Year
Candace Parker, Wooden Award

Team players drafted into the WNBA

See also
Tennessee Lady Volunteers basketball
Pat Summitt
2007 NCAA Division I women's basketball tournament
 2007 SEC women's basketball tournament

References

2006–07 NCAA Division I women's basketball season
Tennessee Lady Volunteers basketball seasons
NCAA Division I women's basketball tournament championship seasons
NCAA Division I women's basketball tournament Final Four seasons
Volunteers
Volunteers
2007 NCAA Division I women's basketball tournament participants